C. William Thomas is an American accountant and currently the Jeb Bush Professor of Accounting at Baylor University, and is also a published author, currently in 482 libraries.

References

Year of birth missing (living people)
Living people
Baylor University faculty
American accountants
American business writers
American financial writers